Thomas Andie Jensen (born April 17, 1972) is a former Danish professional football (soccer) player, who played as a defender for Viborg FF in the Danish Superliga championship.

Andie started his senior career with Brøndby IF, and played one first team game for the club. He moved to Lyngby FC, playing 62 games and scoring two goals for Lyngby in the Danish Superliga from May 1997 to June 2001. He moved to league rivals Viborg FF, playing 161 games and scoring 11 goals for Viborg in the Superliga. Andie ended his playing career in December 2007.

References

1972 births
Living people
People from Mariager
Danish men's footballers
Brøndby IF players
Lyngby Boldklub players
Viborg FF players
Danish Superliga players
Association football defenders
Sportspeople from the North Jutland Region